The Fuji KM-2 is a Japanese propeller-driven light aircraft, which was developed by Fuji Heavy Industries from the Beech T-34 Mentor which Fuji built under licence.  Various versions have been used as primary trainers by the Japan Self-Defense Forces, with the KM-2B remaining in service with the Japan Air Self-Defense Force.

Design and development

Fuji Heavy Industries was established in July 1952 as a successor to Nakajima, and undertook licensed production of the Beech T-34 trainer aircraft as its first product. This was used by Fuji for the development of the Fuji LM-1 Nikko which was a four-seat liaison aircraft powered by a 225 hp Continental O-470 engine, with introduction of a more powerful 340 hp Lycoming O-480 engine resulting in redesignation as the LM-2, with both the LM-1 and LM-2 being used by the Japan Ground Self-Defense Force.

The KM was a four-seat civil version of the LM-1, fitted with the more powerful Lycoming engine that was later used by the LM-2. After the KM was used by the Japanese government for civil pilot training, the KM-2 was developed as a side-by-side two-seat trainer, first flying on 16 January 1962.  Sixty-two were purchased by the Japan Maritime Self-Defense Force as primary trainers, with a further two purchased by the Japan Ground Self-Defense Force as the TL-1.

The KM-2B was a further development of the KM-2 for use as a primary trainer for the Japan Air Self-Defense Force. It combined the structure and engine of the KM-2 with the tandem cockpit of the T-34 Mentor, first flying on 17 January 1978.  Fifty were purchased by the JASDF as the Fuji T-3, production continuing until 1992.

Operators

Japan Air Self-Defense Force
Japan Maritime Self-Defense Force
Japan Ground Self-Defense Force

Specifications (KM-2)

See also

References

1960s Japanese military trainer aircraft
Single-engined tractor aircraft
Low-wing aircraft
KM-2
Aircraft first flown in 1962